Michalis Stamatogiannis (born 20 May 1982 in Athens) is a Greek shot putter.

He finished tenth (in discus throw) at the 1999 World Youth Championships and ninth at the 2000 World Junior Championships. He also competed at the 2008 Olympic Games without reaching the final.

His personal best is 20.17 metres, achieved on 20 July 2011 in Patras. In the indoor track he has set a Greek record of 20.36 metres.

Stamatogiannis was found guilty for doping violation in May 2014 and got 2 years ban until July 2016.

Doping
Stamatogiannis tested positive for the anabolic steroid Stanozolol on 31 May 2014, and was subsequently handed a two-year ban from sport.

Competition record

References

External links

1982 births
Living people
Doping cases in athletics
Greek male shot putters
Greek male discus throwers
Greek sportspeople in doping cases
Athletes (track and field) at the 2008 Summer Olympics
Athletes (track and field) at the 2012 Summer Olympics
Olympic athletes of Greece
Athletes from Athens
Athletes (track and field) at the 2009 Mediterranean Games
Mediterranean Games competitors for Greece
21st-century Greek people